Xiong Rulin (born January 2, 1978, also known as Shawn Rolling) is a Christian singer from China and winner of CCTV Dream China singer contest in 2006.

Biography 
When he was a junior high school student, he passed ten-tier piano exam in China. In 1997, he worked at bars playing music. In 1999, he became a TV host of 昆明 television. In 2000, he held a personal concert. From 2003 to 2006, he studied in Ashland University, Ohio and Berklee College of Music, Boston. He majored in jazz in college.

He returned to China from USA and won  first place in Dream China (Chinese version of American Idol) in 2006 and was named China's New Male Artist of the Year in 2007. In 2007, his first song Invincible (天下无敌) was released in China.

In 2021, he appeared on "China Music Pop Chart" special program "TOP Star Interview," and performed his new single "Rush Me."

Rulin's style of music varies from rock to jazz to sometimes popular, both in Chinese and English.

Discography

Albums 

 2011 - Aviation Blvd
 2012 - 面朝大海 春暖花开 EP
 2021 - Rise of Kingdoms - Truth of the Land

References

External links
Ru-Lin, Xiong blog

1978 births
Living people
Ashland University alumni
Berklee College of Music alumni
Singers from Yunnan
People from Chuxiong
21st-century Chinese male singers